Perupok is a small town in Bachok District, Kelantan, Malaysia.

References

Bachok District
Towns in Kelantan